State Highway 62 (SH 62) is a State Highway in Kerala, India that starts in Guruvayoor and ends in Kundukadavu.

The Route Map 
Guruvayoor – Althara – Perumpadappu – Maranchery – Kanjiramukku – Kundukadavu (joins Palakkad – Ponnani road)

See also 
Roads in Kerala
List of State Highways in Kerala

References 

State Highways in Kerala
Roads in Thrissur district
Transport in Guruvayur